Sedbergh School was a private English language senior school located in Montebello, Quebec, Canada which offers coeducation programs (grade seven to university entrance) and boarding facilities for Canadian and international students.  Due to declining enrollment and poor economic forecasts, Sedbergh School closed down operations in June 2010.

Sedbergh School at a Glance
 Grades: 7-12
 Enrollment - Boys: 53 Girls: 15
 Boarding: 80 
 Campus Size (acres): 1200
 Year Founded: 1939
 Year Closed:  2010

Athletic Programmes
Interscholastic Athletic Programmes:
 Alpine Skiing
 Nordic Ski Racing
 Nordic Skiing
 Outdoor Education
 Rugby
 Snowboarding
 Soccer

Recreational Athletic Programmes:
 Alpine Ski Racing
 Alpine Skiing
 Badminton
 Basketball
 Camping
 Canoeing / Kayaking
 Cross-Country Running
 Cycling
 Golf
 Hiking
 Ice Hockey
 Mountain Biking
 Nordic Ski Racing
 Nordic Skiing
 Outdoor Education
 Rock Climbing
 Rugby
 Snowboarding
 Soccer
 Softball
 Squash
 Table Tennis
 Tennis
 Volleyball
 Weightlifting

Clubs and organizations
 Chess Club
 Community Service
 Habitat for Humanity
 Newspaper
 Peer Counseling
 Peer Tutoring
 Student Activities
 Weightlifting
 Yearbook

Notable alumni
 Peter Kirby
 Michael Pitfield
 Scott Griffin

External links
 Sedbergh School Canada / official website
 Find Sedbergh School on Google Maps (and get directions)
 Sedbergh School Admissions

English-language schools in Quebec
Boarding schools in Quebec
High schools in Quebec
Private schools in Quebec
Round Square schools
Education in Outaouais
Educational institutions established in 1939
Educational institutions disestablished in 2010
1939 establishments in Quebec
2010 disestablishments in Quebec